Bermuda competed at the 2020 Summer Paralympics in Tokyo, Japan, from 25 August to 6 September 2020. This was their seventh consecutive appearance at the Summer Paralympics since 1996.

Athletics

Bermuda have qualified quotas for athletics.

PB: Personal Best | DNA: Did not advance

See also 
 Bermuda at the Paralympics
 Bermuda at the 2020 Summer Olympics

References 

Nations at the 2020 Summer Paralympics
2020
2021 in Bermudian sport